Putney is an unincorporated community and coal town in  Harlan County, Kentucky, United States.

References

Unincorporated communities in Harlan County, Kentucky
Unincorporated communities in Kentucky
Coal towns in Kentucky